Michael Shane Neal (born November 23, 1968) is an American portrait artist who currently serves as the chairman of the Portrait Society of America. In 2020, Neal's painting of Congressman John Lewis was acquired by the Smithsonian Institution's National Portrait Gallery as a part of their permanent exhibit entitled "The Struggle for Justice." Neal has created official portraits for the United States Capitol of U.S. Senator Arthur Vandenberg, former Majority Leader and U.S. Senator Robert C. Byrd, 10th Architect of the Capitol Alan Hantman, and over 400 works of art depicting various public figures. Commissions include Supreme Court Justice Sandra Day O'Connor for the Sandra Day O'Connor School of Law at Arizona State University, former Secretary of Energy Spencer Abraham for the Department of Energy, and U.S. Senator Arlen Specter for Yale Law School.

Background

Neal's commission to paint Senator Arthur Vandenberg for the United States Capitol in Washington, D.C. was the first portrait of its kind to be added to the Senate Reception Room in nearly 50 years. Neal received the commission at age 32, making him among the youngest artists ever commissioned by the United States Senate.

A protégé of the nation's leading portrait artist Everett Raymond Kinstler, Neal exhibited alongside Kinstler in a 2003 show entitled Realism Now: Mentors and Protégées at America's oldest gallery, The Vose Galleries, in Boston, Massachusetts. Neal was listed among 20 rising stars in the world of art by American Artist.

His work has been featured in publications such as American Artist, International Artist, Artist's Sketchbook, The Artist's Magazine, Art News, Fine Art Connoisseur, Roll Call, The Hill, and AskMen.com. Neal has been elected to membership to the National Arts Club, Allied Artists of America, Audubon Artists of America, and Portrait Society of America. He is represented in notable commissions by Portraits, Inc.

Awards
2000 First Place Portrait Society of America International Portrait Competition
2001 Grand Prize Portrait Society of America International Portrait Competition
2004 Catherine Lorilland Wolfe Award from the National Arts Club
2004 Tara Fredrix Award from the Audubon Artists of America
2005 Artist’s Magazine Award of Excellence at the Oil Painters of America National Exhibition
2007 Grumbacher Gold Medallion from the National Arts Club, 108th Exhibiting Artist Members' Show

References

External links
 
 Senate Unveils Portrait of Senator Byrd

1968 births
Living people
20th-century American painters
American male painters
21st-century American painters
21st-century American male artists
American portrait painters
Lipscomb University alumni
20th-century American male artists